Alepochori is a village and a community in southern Achaea, Greece. Alepochori is located on the northern slope of Mount Erymanthos, about 35 km south of Patras. In 2011 it had a population of 99 for the village and 236 for the community, which includes the village Agios Dimitrios.

Population

History
The area followed the fate of the rest of Achaea. Between 1460 and 1821 the area was ruled by the Ottoman Turks, except a brief period of Venetian rule between 1687 and 1715. In the Venetian censuses of 1697 and 1699 the village was called  Alpochori Trano (Αλποχώρι Τρανό) and had 111 inhabitants, in 1700, it had 38 families.  Alepochori became Greek after the Greek War of Independence of 1821.

Alepochori was part of the municipality of Erymanthia between 1835 and 1841, and of the municipality of Tritaia between 1841 and 1912. It was an independent community between 1912 and 1998, and became part of Tritaia again in 1998. At the 2010 Kallikratis reform, it became part of the new municipality Erymanthos.

See also
List of settlements in Achaea

References

External links

 Alpochori GTP Travel Pages

Populated places in Achaea